Flames of Freedom  (also known as Midwinter II: Flames of Freedom) is a first-person shooter role-playing video game with simulation elements developed by Maelstrom Games and published by MicroProse for MS-DOS, Amiga, and Atari ST in 1991. It is a sequel to the 1989 game Midwinter and its working title was Wildfire. The Amiga version was re-released by Kixx XL in 1993.

Gameplay

The game's setting is the world following the end of the impact winter scenario from the first Midwinter. Players take on the role of Atlantic Federation's covert operative working to liberate a chain of tropical Slave Isles from the oppressive Saharan Empire, who run the African continent.

The missions are generally open-ended, allowing the player to approach them in whatever fashion is desired. Each island has different objectives (sabotage, assassinations, etc.), and the order in which these are tackled is up to the player. The game attempts to create a detailed open world by providing a number of different characters and different vehicles that the player can interact with. Vehicles include land, air, and sea vessels (players can hijack any enemy-operated vehicle), although all of them control in more or less the same basic manner. The graphics are relatively rudimentary 3D, although typical for the time period.

Reception

Midwinter II won several accolades, including 96% / CVG Hit by C+VG and 95% / ACE TrailBlazer by ACE for the Atari ST version, and 92% / CU Screen Star by CU Amiga for the Amiga version. A 1994 Computer Gaming World survey of strategic space games set in the year 2000 and later gave the game two-plus stars out of five, stating that because of its "more temperate environment" it was "less interesting than its predecessor".

References

External links
 
 Midwinter II: Flames of Freedom at Amiga HOL database

1991 video games
Action role-playing video games
Amiga games
Atari ST games
DOS games
First-person shooters
Open-world video games
MicroProse games
Post-apocalyptic video games
Single-player video games
Spy video games
Video game sequels
Video games developed in the United Kingdom
Video games scored by David Lowe
Video games set in the 21st century
Simulation video games
Video_games_set_on_fictional_islands